Rad Wings of Destiny is the fifth album by the American rock band Ugly Kid Joe, released on October 21, 2022. 

The title is a parody of the Judas Priest album, Sad Wings of Destiny.

Critical reception
Tom Cornell of CGCM Rock Radio wrote that "Showing perhaps more subtlety than all those years ago, but still maintaining the fun and silliness in small doses, they still know how to rock and entertain."

Track listing
 "That Ain't Livin'" – 4:18
 "Not Like the Other" – 4:36
 "Everything's Changing" – 4:41
 "Kill the Pain" – 3:52
 "Lola" (The Kinks cover) – 4:03
 "Dead Friends Play" – 3:42
 "Up in the City" – 4:51
 "Drinkin' and Drivin'" – 2:23
 "Failure" – 4:48
 "Long Road" – 3:33

Lineup 
 Whitfield Crane – vocals
 Dave Fortman – guitar, producer
 Klaus Eichstadt – guitar
 Cordell Crockett – bass
 Zac Morris – drums ( tracks 2, 3, 4, 8, 9, 10 )

Additional personnel:
 Shannon Larkin – drums ( tracks 1, 5, 6, 7 )
 Jeff Curran – guitar ( tracks 1, 8 ) and banjo ( track 8 )
 Ram Cantu - piano ( track 8 )

Charts

References

2022 albums
Ugly Kid Joe albums